Portugal had only two queens regnant: Maria I and Maria II (and, arguably, two more: Beatriz for a short period of time in the 14th century; and Teresa, in the 12th century, which technically makes her the first ruler and first queen of Portugal).

The other queens were queens consort, wives of the Portuguese kings. Many of them were highly influential in the country's history, either ruling as regents for their minor children or having a great influence over their spouses.

Elizabeth of Aragon, who was married to Denis, was made a saint after there were said to have been miracles performed after her death.

The husband of a Portuguese queen regnant could only be titled king after the birth of any child from that marriage. Portugal had two princes consort – Auguste de Beauharnais, 2nd Duke of Leuchtenberg and Ferdinand of Saxe-Coburg and Gotha – both consorts to Maria II. The first one died leaving his wife childless, and therefore never became king. Maria II's second husband was a prince until the birth of their first child, Pedro V. At that point he became jure uxoris king. Maria I's husband, Pedro III, was king automatically after his wife's accession because the couple already had children.

House of Burgundy

House of Aviz

House of Habsburg

House of Braganza

House of Braganza-Saxe-Coburg and Gotha

See also

List of Portuguese monarchs

Notes

 royal consorts, List of Portuguese
Portuguese royal consorts, List of
Portugal